= Michael King (psychiatrist) =

British psychiatrist (1950–2021)

Michael King (10 February 1950 – 10 September 2021) was a British psychiatrist who taught at the University College London. He co-wrote Stress: Theory and Practice and wrote Male Victims of Sexual Assault, a book that defined male rape in British criminal law. He published 800 articles and advised over 30 PhD students.

King was openly gay since the 1980s, and researched the topic of sexual minorities until his death.
